Norman Robert Tustin (January 3, 1919 in Regina, Saskatchewan — August 16, 1998) was a professional ice hockey player who played 18 games in the National Hockey League with the New York Rangers during the 1941–42 season.

Career statistics

Regular season and playoffs

External links
 

1919 births
1998 deaths
Canadian ice hockey left wingers
Hershey Bears players
Ice hockey people from Saskatchewan
Minneapolis Millers (AHA) players
New Haven Eagles players
New Haven Ramblers players
New York Rangers players
Ontario Hockey Association Senior A League (1890–1979) players
Owen Sound Greys players
St. Louis Flyers players
Sportspeople from Regina, Saskatchewan